The Icelandic Footballer of the Year is an annual award chosen by a panel of officials, coaches and former players, to determine the best player in Iceland.

History
The inaugural winner was Guðni Kjartansson in 1973. Initially, the award could have been given to both male and female players. In 1994, Ásta B. Gunnlaugsdóttir became the first woman to win the award. In 1997, the award was split into men and women's categories.

In 1989, Ólafur Þórðarson won the award whilst playing abroad, having played for Norwegian club Brann.

Up until 2004, the award had been chosen by the Football Association of Iceland. It is now chosen by a panel of officials, coaches and former players.

Winners

Men & Women

Source:

Men

Women

Source:

See also

 List of sports awards honoring women

References

Association football player of the year awards by nationality
Icelandic Footballer
Awards established in 1973
Annual events in Iceland